Wieringa is a Dutch surname. Notable people with the surname include: 

 Kees Wieringa,  Dutch pianist, composer and television program maker
 Roel Wieringa (born 1952), Dutch computer scientist 
 Tommy Wieringa, (born 1967), Dutch writer
 Wiert Jan Wieringa (1912-1993), Dutch historian